Andhra University (IAST: Āndhra Vișvakalāpariṣhat) is a public university located in Visakhapatnam, Andhra Pradesh, India. It was established in 1926.

History 

King Vikram Deo Verma, the Maharaja of Jeypore was one of the biggest donors of the university. He donated lands and two million rupees for the establishment of the university which was set to be shifted elsewhere by the education authorities due to lack of funding. Furthermore, he provided  lakh annually to the university, an approximate figure of  lakhs between 1930s - 1940s.a The liberal king was conferred an Honorary Doctorate degree from the university. The Jeypore College of Technology and Science in Andhra University was founded by Maharajah Vikram Deo.

University emblem 
The university emblem was designed by Sri Kowta Rammohan Sastri with the guidance of Cattamanchi Ramalinga Reddy. The rising sun represents the university itself and the radiating light rays representing its faculties of study. The lotus is the seat of Goddess Lakshmi (prosperity) and Saraswati (knowledge). The swastika is the symbol of benediction. An ocean is the vast region of knowledge. The two serpents represent the seekers and custodians of wisdom.

Faculties and departments 

Andhra University College of Arts and Commerce (established 1931)
Andhra University College of Engineering (established 1955)
Andhra University College of Engineering for Women (established 2010)
Dr. B. R. Ambedkar College of Law (formerly AU College of Law)(established 1945)
Andhra University College of Pharmaceutical Sciences (established 1951)
Andhra University College of Science and Technology (established 1931)
Andhra University School of Distance Education (established 1972)

Rankings 

Andhra University was ranked 1001+ in the world by the Times Higher Education World University Rankings of 2020 and 351–400 in Asia. The QS World University Rankings of 2020 ranked it 351–400 in Asia. It was ranked 36th in India overall by the National Institutional Ranking Framework in 2020 and 19th among universities. NIRF also ranked the Andhra University College of Pharmaceutical Sciences 34th in India in the pharmacy ranking.

Notable alumni

Artists and writers

Politicians, civil servants, and lawyers

Others 
 Satya N. Atluri, Mechanical Engineering (1959-1963), recipient of the Padma Bhushan Award for 2013 in science & engineering
 Neeli Bendapudi, 18th president of the University of Louisville in Louisville, Kentucky, US, president elect of Penn State University
 B. M. Choudary, inorganic chemist, Shanti Swarup Bhatnagar laureate
 Undurti Narasimha Das, immunologist, Shanti Swarup Bhatnagar laureate
 Kunchithapadam Gopalan, geochronologist, Shanti Swarup Bhatnagar laureate
 Chennupati Jagadish, applied physics 1977–1980, Companion of the Order of Australia
 Pilli Alfred James, public administrator
 S. Rao Kosaraju, Computer Science (1959–1964), founder of the Kosaraju's algorithm, which finds the strongly connected components of a directed graph
 Kolluru Sree Krishna, geophysicist, Shanti Swarup Bhatnagar laureate
 N. S. Raghavan, Electrical Engineering 1959–1964, co-founder of Infosys
 Anumolu Ramakrishna, former Deputy Managing Director of Larsen & Toubro and Padma Bhushan recipient
B. L. S. Prakasa Rao, statistician, Shanti Swarup Bhatnagar laureate and National Science Foundation Fellow
 Barry Ramachandra Rao, space physicist, Shanti Swarup Bhatnagar laureate
 C. R. Rao, statistician, National Medal of Science laureate
 G. S. R. Subba Rao, natural product chemist, Shanti Swarup Bhatnagar laureate
 Grandhi Mallikarjuna Rao, Mechanical Engineering, founder and Chairman of the GMR Group, an infrastructure enterprise
 Neelamraju Ganga Prasada Rao, plant breeder, popularly known as the "father of hybrid sorghum", Shanti Swarup Bhatnagar recipient
 B. S. Daya Sagar, geoengineering (1988–1994), only Asian recipient of Georges Matheron Lectureship Award from International Association for Mathematical Geosciences
 B. L. K. Somayajulu, geochemist, Shanti Swarup Bhatnagar laureate
 Adusumilli Srikrishna, organic chemist, Shanti Swarup Bhatnagar laureate
 Duvvuri Subbarao, economist and former Reserve Bank of India Governor
 Srinivasan Varadarajan, chemist and Padma Bhushan awardee

See also 
 List of universities in India
 Universities and colleges in India

References

External links 

Official website

 
Universities and colleges in Visakhapatnam
1926 establishments in India
Educational institutions established in 1926
Uttarandhra
State universities in Andhra Pradesh